Catholic High School, Melaka (CHS Melaka) or Sekolah Menengah Jenis Kebangsaan Katholik, Melaka is a state secondary boys' school located at Gajah Berang Road in Malacca City.

Foundation 
On 4 January 1958, the school was established and known as St. Francis Catholic Chinese High School (Sekolah Tinggi Cina St. Francis). The school started with 2 transition classes consisting of 71 students who were former students of the Catholic Elementary School. This group consists of male and female students. On November 1958, the foundation stone of this school was officially laid by the Governor of Malacca, Leong Yew Koh. In 1959, the building Block A consists of 8 classrooms were completed. The construction cost was funded by the Catholic Church. In 1961, Block B consisting of 3 classrooms and 3 science laboratories was completed and inaugurated by the Director of Education, R.A. Wilson. On 1 April, the school changed its name to Sekolah Tinggi Katholik, Melaka. The students of this school have occupied the LCE for the first time. In March 1962, Block C consisting of 9 classrooms and a library was also completed. In 1985, a four-story block consisting of the principal's office, teacher's room, library room, screening room, and 8 classrooms was started to be built. This new block has been shared for use by both secondary and primary school.

Development 
In 1999, the number of students increased to more than 1,000 people. In 2001, computer classes are held. The SMK Alumni Association donated MYR10,000 to buy 10 computers. On 20 April 2008, in conjunction with the celebration of the 50th anniversary a dinner was held to collect donations for the development of basic school facilities. The collection revenue is approximately MYR100,000. On 21 October 2010, the school governing board, parent–teacher association, alumni association and the school in collaboration with Nanyang Press group and Carlsberg company held a charity dinner concert to collect donations for the multi-purpose school hall construction fund. Almost 1 million ringgit was collected. On 30 July 2011, the multi-purpose hall was completed. In December 2013, the upgrade of the science laboratories and the guidance and counseling unit room was carried out. In December 2015, the 21st Century Classroom was established with the help and support of the school governing board, parent–teacher association and the alumni association. In 2017, the school was approved by the Malaysian Ministry of Education to implement the Dual Language Programme. On 25 May 2018, in collaboration with Tiger Company, the school has held a charity dinner concert to collect donations for the 'Smart Classroom' installation fund. The banquet managed to collect MYR571,660. In November 2018, the school library has been upgraded. On 12 April 2019, the 'Smart Classroom' was launched throughout the school. On 23 January 2023, the school hosted a dinner to celebrate its 65th anniversary. The dinner was attended by many alumni, this includes the first and second batch alumnae.

School staff

References

Secondary schools in Malaysia
Schools in Malacca
Marist Brothers schools
Catholic schools in Malaysia
1958 establishments in Malaya
Educational institutions established in 1958
Boys' schools in Malaysia
Chinese-language schools in Malaysia
Publicly funded schools in Malaysia